Intrajugular process of occipital bone (Processus intrajugularis ossis occipitalis) is a small, pointed process extending from the middle of the jugular notch of occipital bone, that subdivides the jugular notch of the occipital bone into a lateral and a medial part.

References 

Bones of the head and neck